Jelena Vučković is a Serbian-born American professor and Chair of the Department of Electrical Engineering at Stanford University, and a courtesy faculty member in the Department of Applied Physics at Stanford University. Vučković leads the Nanoscale and Quantum Photonics (NQP) Lab, and is a faculty member of the Ginzton Lab, PULSE Institute, SIMES Institute, and Bio-X at Stanford. She was the inaugural director of the Q-FARM initiative (Quantum Fundamentals, ARchitecture and Machines). She is a Fellow of The Optical Society, the American Physical Society and the Institute of Electrical and Electronics Engineers.

Vučković's research interests include nanophotonics, quantum information technologies, quantum optics, photonics inverse design, nonlinear optics, optoelectronics, cavity QED.

Vučković is also an associate editor for ACS Photonics Journal.

Early life and education
Jelena Vučković was born in Niš, Serbia. She studied at the University of Niš. She received her M.S. (1997) and PhD (2002) in Electrical Engineering from the California Institute of Technology (Caltech). In 2002, she was a postdoctoral scholar in the Applied Physics Department at Stanford. She became Assistant Professor in the Electrical Engineering Department in 2003.

Career and research
Vučković is the Jensen Huang Professor in Global Leadership, Professor of Electrical Engineering, and by courtesy of Applied Physics at Stanford University. She is the lead/principal investigator the NQP Lab at Stanford, and is a faculty member of the Ginzton Lab, PULSE, SPRC, SystemX, and Bio-X.

As of 2018, she was part of the Max Planck Institute of Quantum Optics (MPQ), a Scientific Advisory Board Member, part of the Ferdinand-Braun Institute, and a SystemX Board Member.

Her PhD advisees include Ilya Fushman (PhD 2008), and she and Fushman were among lead authors on a quantum computing paper published in Nature in 2007 and Science in 2008.

Other PhD advisees include Andrei Faraon (PhD 2009), MIT professor Dirk Englund (PhD 2008), and Hatice Altug (PhD 2006), professor at the Swiss Federal Institute of Technology Lausanne.

, Vuckovic's research areas include: nanophotonics, quantum information, quantum technology, quantum optics, Integrated quantum photonics, photonics inverse design, nonlinear optics, optoelectronics, and cavity QED.

Vučković's lab invented a software suite called Spins. It automates the design of arbitrary nanophotonic devices by leveraging gradient-based optimization techniques that can explore a large space of possible designs. The resulting devices have higher efficiencies, smaller footprints, and novel functionalities. , Vučković holds 15 patents.

Vučković was the "Fortinet Founders" chair of the Stanford Department of Electrical Engineering as of 2023, leading the department's Nanoscale and Quantum Photonics (NQP) lab.

Awards and honors
 Presidential Early Career Award for Scientists and Engineers (PECASE), (2006)
Humboldt Prize (2010)
 Marko V. Jaric award for outstanding achievements in physics (2012)
 Hans Fischer Senior Fellow, Institute for Advanced Studies, Technical University Munich, Germany (2013)
 Fellow, American Physical Society (2015)
Fellow, The Optical Society (2015)
Fellow, Institute of Electrical and Electronics Engineers, (2018)
Distinguished Scholar, Max Planck Institute for Quantum Optics, (2019)
 Recipient, IET A F Harvey Prize, (2019)
 Recipient, James P. Gordon Memorial Speakership, Optica (2020)
 Mildred Dresselhaus Lecturer, Massachusetts Institute of Technology (2021)
 Vannevar Bush Faculty Fellow, United States Department of Defense (2022)

References

External links 
 
 Jelena Vuckovic, Stanford University

Year of birth missing (living people)
Living people
Fellows of Optica (society)
Stanford University Department of Electrical Engineering faculty
American women engineers
American women physicists
Fellows of the American Physical Society
Humboldt Research Award recipients
21st-century women engineers
People from Niš
University of Niš alumni
California Institute of Technology alumni
Serbian emigrants to the United States
Women in optics
Optical engineers